John Paul Lazor (September 9, 1912 – December 9, 2002) was a backup outfielder in Major League Baseball who played from 1943 through 1946 for the Boston Red Sox (1943–1946). Born in King County, Washington, he batted left-handed and threw right-handed.

Lazor provided four years of good services for the Red Sox while left fielder Ted Williams and center fielder Dom DiMaggio were in the military service. His most productive season came in 1945, when he posted career-highs in games played (101), batting average (.310), runs scored (35), runs batted in (45), doubles (19) and home runs (5). 

In a four-season career, Lazor was a .263 hitter with six home runs and 62 RBI in 224 games. He finished his professional career with the Portland Beavers of the Pacific Coast League, playing for them 280 games from 1947 to 1949.

Lazor died in Renton, Washington at the age of 90. Until the Red Sox signed J.T. Snow, who wore 84 in 2006, Lazor had worn the highest number in Red Sox history. Lazor previously had worn number 82 in 1943. In a December 2001 interview, Lazor said he did not know why he wore the number and claimed he thought he wore the number 29. Snow was later surpassed by Alfredo Aceves in 2011 for highest number worn in Red Sox history (Aceves wore number 91).

References

External links

Historic Baseball
Retrosheet

1912 births
2002 deaths
Baseball players from Washington (state)
Boston Red Sox players
Canton Terriers players
Danville-Scholfield Leafs players
Louisville Colonels (minor league) players
Major League Baseball outfielders
Moultrie Packers players
People from King County, Washington
Portland Beavers players
San Diego Padres (minor league) players
Scranton Red Sox players